Birch Run Area Schools is a school district headquartered in Birch Run, Michigan. It is a part of the Saginaw Intermediate School District and serves the Birch Run area, including the village of Birch Run, Taymouth Township, and all but the northeastern sections of Birch Run Township. Its schools include North Elementary School, Marshall Greene Middle School, and Birch Run High School.

References

External links

 Birch Run Area Schools

School districts in Michigan
Saginaw Intermediate School District